Prince Andrew (born 1960) is the second son of Queen Elizabeth II and Prince Philip, Duke of Edinburgh.

Prince Andrew may also refer to:

People 
 Prince Andrew Alexandrovich of Russia (1897–1981), second child of Grand Duke Alexander Mikhailovich
 Prince Andrew of Greece and Denmark (1882–1944), seventh child of George I of Greece and father of Prince Philip, Duke of Edinburgh
 Prince Andrew of Yugoslavia (1929–1990), third son of Alexander I of Yugoslavia
 Prince Andrew Romanoff (1923–2021), youngest child of Prince Andrei Alexandrovich

Places 
 Prince Andrew High School, in Dartmouth, Nova Scotia, Canada
 Prince Andrew Plateau, in the Queen Elizabeth Range of Antarctica